Jorge Nicolás Figal (born 3 April 1994) is an Argentine professional footballer who plays as a centre-back for Boca Juniors.

Club career
Figal's career began with then-Primera B Nacional side Independiente in 2014, with his debut for the first-team coming on 4 May against Gimnasia de Jujuy; a match Independiente lost 1–0. Figal made five more appearances in all competitions in his first season with the club as they were promoted into the Primera División. His top division debut came on 10 August 2014 in a 3–0 home victory versus Atlético de Rafaela. Eighteen more appearances came in the rest of 2014 and in the following season, 2015, before he was loaned out to Primera División club Olimpo in February 2016. Figal scored his first pro goal against Rosario Central on 2 April.

He returned to Independiente in June ahead of 2016–17, a campaign that saw him net his first goal for the team in; versus Arsenal de Sarandí on 23 April 2017. Sixty-nine total appearances came in the three seasons following his loan away. After being a part of Independiente's 2017 Copa Sudamericana winning squad, Figal appeared at the following year's Suruga Bank Championship; which they also won, following a win in Japan over Cerezo Osaka.

On 30 January 2020, Figal joined Major League Soccer expansion side Inter Miami CF.

International career
In August 2019, Figal received a senior call-up from Lionel Scaloni for friendlies in the succeeding September against Chile and Mexico in the United States.

Personal life
On 14 September 2017, Figal was banned from football for nine months after failing a drugs test, testing positive for diuretic. The ban was backdated, meaning he was unavailable for selection until 4 January 2018; six months after the announcement. He returned to action on 24 January, playing the full ninety minutes in a draw with Rosario Central.

Career statistics
.

Honours
Independiente
 Copa Sudamericana: 2017
 Suruga Bank Championship: 2018

Boca Juniors
Primera División: 2022
Copa de la Liga Profesional: 2022
Supercopa Argentina: 2022

References

External links

1994 births
Living people
Sportspeople from Buenos Aires Province
Argentine footballers
Association football defenders
Argentine Primera División players
Primera Nacional players
Club Atlético Independiente footballers
Olimpo footballers
Doping cases in association football
Argentine sportspeople in doping cases
Inter Miami CF players
Major League Soccer players
Boca Juniors footballers